Viera Schottertova (born May 10, 1982 in Topoľčany, Slovakia) is a Slovak model.

Biography

Early life
She was actively involved in dancing as a child, and anticipated a career in ballet before her unique looks decided otherwise.

Career
Schottertova moved to Vienna after participating in the Elite Model Look Contest. From there her international career quickly took off and she featured on covers and editorials for magazines such as Elle, Marie Claire, DS, Vogue and major advertising campaigns for Armani, Bernd Berger, Bolero, Chanel cosmetics, Custo Barcelona, Gant, Horizons, Lou lingerie, Mango, Marc Cain, Olivier Strelli, Red Point, Rimmel, Tag woman, TaiFun, Trixi Schober, Walter Leder, Women's Secret, Yera. She has also appeared in Victoria's Secret catalogs.

Personal life
Schottertova got first married when she was 17 and had a son, Loren. Subsequently, she was married to  an Ivorian diplomat Souleyman Domumoya, with whom she lived in Corona, New York and had a daughter Gabriela. In 2015, she returned back to Topoľčany, desiring quieter living environment to raise children. In 2019, she announced the birth of her second son, Marián on Instagram.

References

1982 births
Living people
People from Topoľčany
Slovak female models